The Kamianytsia Lyzohub in Sedniv, Chernihiv Oblast, is the oldest stone residential building on Left-Bank Ukraine.

Constructed in the 17th century, the building is a Ukrainian architectural monument.

Residential buildings in Ukraine